Neil Niren Connery (16 December 1938 – 9 May 2021) was a Scottish actor and the younger brother of actor Sean Connery.

Personal
Connery was born in Edinburgh, Scotland, on 16 December 1938. The Connery family is of partial Irish origin. His father, Joseph Connery, was a lorry driver; and his mother, Euphemia (Effie) McLean, worked as a cleaner. Connery had a modest upbringing in a deprived area of Edinburgh.

He was married to Eleanor, with whom he had two daughters.

Six months after his older brother Sean died, Connery died on 9 May 2021, aged 82, from a short illness.

Career 
Connery's film debut was in O.K. Connery (1967), a James Bond–inspired film. The film was retitled Operation Kid Brother in the United States and is also known as Operation Double 007. It became known for having a number of the original James Bond series actors appearing as similar characters. OK Connery was featured on Mystery Science Theater 3000 (1998) under its alternative title, Operation Double 007.

In 1969, Connery appeared in the science fiction film The Body Stealers, also known as Thin Air, where he played Jim Radford, an investigator trying to figure out why paratroopers are disappearing in mid-air.

In 1980, Connery appeared as a guest star in the British TV Series Only When I Laugh. He played the Neil Niren MD – CT character, in the 7th episode ("Last Tango") from the second season.

For most of his life, Connery worked as a plasterer, until an accident in 1983 ended his career.

Filmography
O.K. Connery (1967) as Dr. Neil Connery (film debut)
The Body Stealers (1969) as Jim Radford

References

External links

1938 births
2021 deaths
Scottish male film actors
Scottish people of Irish descent
Male actors from Edinburgh